Keith Johnson is an American neurologist and radiologist working at Massachusetts General Hospital. He is one of the top highly-cited researchers (h>100) according to webometrics.

References 

Living people
Year of birth missing (living people)
Massachusetts General Hospital faculty
Harvard Medical School alumni
University of Kansas School of Medicine alumni
American neurologists
American radiologists